was a Japanese actor who appeared in supporting roles in such films as Akira Kurosawa's The Bad Sleep Well and Yojimbo, Kihachi Okamoto's Sword of Doom, Yoshitaro Nomura's Zero Focus, and Kon Ichikawa's The Burmese Harp (where he was credited as Akira Nishimura).

Nishimura made his film debut in the Shin Saburi film Fusetsu Nijyunen in 1951. He won the Blue Ribbon Awards for best supporting actor in 1964 for Unholy Desire directed by Shohei Imamura. In 1982, he won the Best Actor award in the Mainichi Film Awards for his performances in Matagi. 

In Japan, Nishimura is well known for playing the role of the title character in the long-running television jidaigeki series Mito Kōmon from 1983 to 1992. He also portrayed the voice of the "Mamo/Howard Lockewood" in the original Japanese version of anime film The Mystery of Mamo in 1978.

Filmography

Film
The Burmese Harp (1956)
Sun in the Last Days of the Shogunate (1957)
Umi no yarodomo (1957)
Arashi no naka o tsuppashire  (1958)
The Ballad of Narayama (1958)
Kurenai no tsubasa  (1958)
Ballad of the Cart (1959)
The Bad Sleep Well (1960)
Mutekiga Ore o Yondeiru (1960)
Zero Focus (1961)
Yojimbo (1961)
Burari Bura-bura Monogatari (1962)Gorath (1962) as Murata, Minister of SpaceHigh and Low (1963)Rickshaw Man (1963 version)Bushido, Samurai Saga (1963)Attack Squadron! (1963)Unholy Desire (1964)Kunoichi Keshō (1964)Sleepy Eyes of Death 5: Sword of Fire (1965)Ninpō-chushingura (1965)The Sword of Doom (1966) as ShichibeiThe Dancing Girl of Izu (1967 Toho version)Zatoichi the Outlaw (1967)Black Lizard (1968)The Living Skeleton (1968)Black Rose Mansion (1969)The Wild Sea (1969)Zatoichi, The Festival Of Fire (1970)Hanzo The Razor: Sword of Justice (1972)Lady Snowblood (1973)Tsugaru Folk Song (1973)Hanzo The Razor: The Snare (1973)
 Karei-naru Ichizoku (1974)Hanzo The Razor: Who's Got the Gold (1974)New Battles Without Honor and Humanity: The Boss's Head (1975)Hokuriku Proxy War (1977) as Mr. YasuharaThe Incident (1978)
 Ogin-sama (1978)Nomugi Pass (1979)Tokyo: The Last Megalopolis (1988) as Makoto Nishimura47 Ronin (1994) as Kira Yoshinaka

TV DramaTaiga drama seriesHana no Shōgai (1963) as Tada IchiroAkō Rōshi (1964) as Aizawa ShinbeiSan Shimai (1967) as Ennma no ChojiMominoki wa Nokotta (1970)Haru no Sakamichi (TV series) (1971) as Kawai JinzaemonKunitori Monogatari (1973) as Hamura ShohaKaze to Kumo to Niji to (1976) as Minamoto no MamoruHomura Tatsu (1993) as KichijiMito Kōmon as Tokugawa Mitsukuni of season 14 to 21 (1983-1992)Lone Wolf and Cub (Yorozuya Kinnosuke version, 1974) as Yagyū RetsudōTōyama no Kin-san (1975 version)Momotarō-zamurai (1976)Ōedo Sōsamō (season 4, 1976)Umi wa Yomigaeru (1977) as Itō HirobumiNaruto Hichō (1977) as YoamiShiroi Kyotō (1978) as Kyosuke TakemuraAkō Rōshi (1979) as Onodera JyunaiFumō Chitai (1979)Sarutobi Sasuke (1980) as Tokugawa IeyasuDai Chūshingura (1980) as Kira YoshinakaMiyamoto Musashi (1984) as Yagyū SekishūsaiDaichi no Ko (1995)

Anime voiceLupin III: The Mystery of Mamo (1978) as Mamo/Howard LockewoodNutcracker Fantasy (1979) as Uncle Drosselmeyer, Puppeteer, Street Singer, Watchmaker

OtherQuiz Derby''

Honours
Medal with Purple Ribbon (1987)
Order of the Rising Sun, 4th Class, Gold Rays with Rosette (1994)

References

External links

1923 births
1997 deaths
People from Sapporo
Japanese male film actors
20th-century Japanese male actors
Recipients of the Medal with Purple Ribbon
Recipients of the Order of the Rising Sun, 4th class